Robinette is an unincorporated community and census-designated place (CDP) in Logan County, West Virginia, United States, along Buffalo Creek. Its population was 663 as of the 2010 census. Prior to 2010, Robinette was part of the Amherstdale-Robinette CDP.

Geography
Robinette is in southeastern Logan County and is bordered to the west by Amherstdale. Buffalo Creek Road is the main road through the community, following the Buffalo Creek valley. It leads southwest (downstream)  to Man, on the Guyandotte River, and east (upstream)  to the head of the valley.

References

Census-designated places in Logan County, West Virginia
Census-designated places in West Virginia